Sung-Hak "Tom" Mun (born 28 July 1990) is a South Korean racing driver who drove in the FIA Formula Two Championship.

Racing record

Career summary

* Season still in progress

Complete FIA Formula Two Championship results
(key) (Races in bold indicate pole position) (Races in italics indicate fastest lap)

References

External links 

1990 births
Living people
South Korean racing drivers
British Formula Renault 2.0 drivers
FIA Formula Two Championship drivers
People educated at King Edward's School, Witley
Formula Renault BARC drivers
Formula BMW Pacific drivers
Manor Motorsport drivers
Eurotek Motorsport drivers